Carsidava was a Dacian town. Recent research placed Carsidava near Soroca town in Moldova

See also 
 Dacian davae
 List of ancient cities in Thrace and Dacia
 Dacia
 Roman Dacia

References

Further reading

External links 

Dacian towns